Francis Fane of Fulbeck has been used to identify these men:
Sir Francis Fane (Royalist) (c. 1611–1681?), was the third, but second surviving, son of Francis Fane, 1st Earl of Westmorland
Sir Francis Fane (dramatist) (d. 1689?), was the son of Frances Fulbeck (royalist) and grandson of Francis Fane, 1st Earl of Westmorland.